Amylyx Pharmaceuticals, Inc is a biopharmaceutical company headquartered in Cambridge, Massachusetts. Amylyx is best known for AMX0035, an experimental therapy for amyotrophic lateral sclerosis. AMX0035 was approved for medical use in Canada as Albrioza, in June 2022, and in the United States, as Relyvrio, in September 2022.

History 
Amylyx Pharmaceuticals was founded in 2013 by Joshua Cohen and Justin Klee when the two were undergraduate students at Brown University. The two proposed that taurursodiol and sodium phenylbutyrate together might prevent disfunction of mitochondria and the endoplasmic reticulum, safeguarding neurons. Klee and Cohen were advised by Rudolph E. Tanzi, who ultimately served as the founding chair of Amylyx's scientific advisory board. After Klee and Cohen were able to achieve strong results in pre clinical research, Tanzi connected the two to his colleagues at Massachusetts General Hospital, which culminated in clinical trials. The company was granted $2.2 million by the ALS Association with funds raised through the Ice Bucket Challenge.

Amylyx went public in January 2022. The company's shares began trading on the Nasdaq on January 7, 2022 under the symbol AMLX.

References 

2013 establishments in Massachusetts
American companies established in 2013
Biotechnology companies established in 2013
Biotechnology companies of the United States
Companies based in Cambridge, Massachusetts
Pharmaceutical companies established in 2013